Jarvis Terrell Summers (born March 16, 1993) is an American professional basketball player for the Mineros de Zacatecas of the Liga Nacional de Baloncesto Profesional (LNBP).  He played college basketball for Ole Miss.

College career
Summers averaged 10.4 points and 2.4 rebounds per game as the starting point guard at Ole Miss as a freshman. He posted 9.1 points and 1.8 rebounds per game as a sophomore. As a junior, Summers averaged 17.2 points, 2.5 rebounds, and 3.9 assists per game. He received the Howell Trophy honoring the best college basketball player in Mississippi. Summers was named to the Second Team All-SEC as a junior. He averaged 12 points and 1.8 rebounds per game as a senior. He finished his career ranked second in program history in games played (134) and assists (530) and eighth in points (1,629). After his senior season at Ole Miss, Summers underwent surgery.

Professional career
After not being selected in the 2015 NBA Draft, he was picked 10th overall in the NBA D-League Draft by the Rio Grande Valley Vipers. Summers played in Slovakia in the 2016–17 season. In August 2017, he was selected in the 7th round of the G League expansion draft by the Wisconsin Herd.

In 2019, Summers played for the team Red Baron in Malaysia. On March 7, 2020, he signed with the Halcones de Ciudad Obregón of the Circuito de Baloncesto de la Costa del Pacífico (CIBACOPA).

Summers returned to Halcones de Ciudad Obregón for the 2022 CIBACOPA season. He earned All-Star honors.

In September 2022, Summers joined Mineros de Zacatecas of the Liga Nacional de Baloncesto Profesional (LNBP).

References

External links
 
 Ole Miss Rebels bio 

1993 births
Living people
American expatriate basketball people in Mexico
American expatriate basketball people in Slovakia
American expatriate basketball people in Malaysia
American men's basketball players
Basketball players from Jackson, Mississippi
Halcones de Ciudad Obregón players
Mineros de Zacatecas (basketball) players
Ole Miss Rebels men's basketball players
Point guards
Rio Grande Valley Vipers players
Wisconsin Herd players
African-American basketball players
21st-century African-American sportspeople